Piero Bellotti (1 August 1942 – 10 February 2022) was an Italian wrestler. He competed in the men's Greco-Roman 70 kg at the 1968 Summer Olympics.

References

External links
 

1942 births
2022 deaths
Italian male sport wrestlers
Olympic wrestlers of Italy
Wrestlers at the 1968 Summer Olympics
Sportspeople from Turin
20th-century Italian people